William Morgan Cassidy (born September 28, 1957) is an American physician and politician serving as the senior United States senator from Louisiana, a seat he has held since 2015. A member of the Republican Party, he served in the Louisiana State Senate from 2006 to 2009 and in the U.S. House of Representatives from 2009 to 2015.

Born in Highland Park, Illinois, Cassidy is a graduate of Louisiana State University (LSU) and LSU School of Medicine. A gastroenterologist, he was elected to the Louisiana State Senate from the 16th district which included parts of Baton Rouge, in 2006. In 2008, he was elected as the U.S. representative for Louisiana's 6th congressional district, defeating Democratic incumbent Don Cazayoux. In 2014, Cassidy defeated Democratic incumbent Mary Landrieu to represent Louisiana in the U.S. Senate, becoming the first Republican to hold the seat since the end of Reconstruction. He was reelected in 2020.

Cassidy was one of seven Republican senators to vote to convict Donald Trump of incitement of insurrection in his second impeachment trial. As a result, the Republican Party of Louisiana censured him.

Early life and education
William Morgan Cassidy was born in Highland Park, Illinois, one of four sons of Elizabeth and James F. Cassidy, and is of Irish and Welsh descent. He moved to Baton Rouge, Louisiana as an infant, and received a Bachelor of Science from Louisiana State University in 1979 and a Doctor of Medicine from LSU School of Medicine in 1983.

Early career

Medicine 
Cassidy specialized in the treatment of diseases of the liver at the Earl K. Long Medical Center (LSUMC).

In 1998, Cassidy helped found the Greater Baton Rouge Community Clinic to provide uninsured residents of the greater Baton Rouge area with access to free health care. The Clinic provides low-income families with free dental, medical, mental health, and vision care through a "virtual" approach that partners needy patients with doctors who provide care free of charge.

Cassidy has also been involved in setting up the nonprofit Health Centers in Schools, which vaccinates children in the East Baton Rouge Parish School System against hepatitis B and flu.

In the wake of Hurricane Katrina, Cassidy led a group of health care volunteers to convert an abandoned K-Mart into an emergency health care facility, providing basic health care to hurricane victims.

In 2010, Cassidy's alma mater, Louisiana State University, selected him for honoris causa membership in Omicron Delta Kappa, the National Leadership Honor Society.

Politics
Cassidy was first elected to the Louisiana State Senate in 2006 as a Republican. He had previously been a Democrat, supporting Michael Dukakis for president in 1988, donating to Senator Paul Tsongas's 1992 presidential campaign, and to Louisiana Democrats Governor Kathleen Blanco in 2003 and 2004 and Senator Mary Landrieu in 2002. In 2013, Cassidy called his donation to Landrieu a "youthful indiscretion", saying that she "got elected and fell into partisan politics... Louisiana hasn't left Mary, Mary has left us." Since 2001, he has mostly contributed to Republican candidates, including Senator David Vitter. According to Cassidy, he switched parties after the extinction of conservative Democrats and because of his frustration with the bureaucracy and inefficiency of the public hospital system.

On December 9, 2006, Cassidy won a special election for the District 16 seat in the Louisiana Senate. In his first bid for public office, he defeated veteran State Representative William Daniel, a fellow Republican and Libertarian candidate S.B. Zaitoon. The election was held to replace Jay Dardenne, who vacated the seat he had held since 1992 upon his election as Louisiana Secretary of State. Cassidy was sworn in on December 20, 2006. On October 20, 2007, he was reelected to a full four-year term in the Louisiana State Senate. Cassidy received 76% of the vote against Republican Troy "Rocco" Moreau (15%) and Libertarian Richard Fontanesi (9%).

U.S. House of Representatives

Elections
On November 4, 2008, Cassidy was elected to serve Louisiana's 6th district in the U.S. House of Representatives, defeating incumbent Democratic Congressman Don Cazayoux with 48% of the vote. He likely owed his victory to the independent candidacy of state representative Michael L. Jackson. Jackson finished third with 36,100 votes, more than the 25,000-vote margin separating Cassidy and Cazayoux.

In the 2010 midterm elections, Cassidy easily won a second term, defeating Democrat Merritt E. McDonald of Baton Rouge with 66% of the vote. In the 2012 election, Cassidy was reelected again defeating Rufus Holt Craig, Jr., a Libertarian, and Richard Torregano, an Independent. Cassidy received 79% of the vote.

Tenure
In May 2009, Cassidy partnered with California Representative Jackie Speier to introduce legislation that would amend the House of Representatives rules to require that members of Congress list their earmark requests on their Congressional websites. Previous earmark reform efforts had focused on disclosure of earmarks that were funded by Congress. In June 2010, he introduced the Gulf Coast Jobs Preservation Act to terminate the moratorium on deep water drilling and require the Secretary of the Interior to ensure the safety of deep water drilling operations. He worked to ensure that money from the Gulf Coast Restoration Trust Fund which was established in the wake of the BP oil spill, is spent on coastal restoration efforts.

In December 2010, Cassidy voted to extend the tax cuts enacted during the administration of President George W. Bush. He voted for the Constitutional Balanced Budget Amendment of 2011.

In May 2013, Cassidy introduced the Energy Consumers Relief Act of 2013 to require the Environmental Protection Agency (EPA) to submit reports to both the United States Congress and the United States Department of Energy regarding proposed regulation that would have significant compliance costs (an impact of over $1 billion). The Department of Energy and Congress would then have the option of stopping or altering the EPA proposal.

In 2013, due to the American Medical Association's decision to officially recognize obesity as a disease, Senators and Representatives, including Cassidy, helped introduce legislation to lower health care costs and prevent chronic diseases by addressing America's growing obesity crisis. Cassidy said the Treat and Reduce Obesity Act could help empower physicians to use all methods and means to fight the condition.

In June 2013, Cassidy supported a House-passed bill that federally banned abortions after 20 weeks of pregnancy. Also in 2013, Cassidy circulated a draft letter opposing an immigration reform bill, asking for signatures. Representative Mark Takano, a high school literature teacher for 23 years, marked it up in red pen like a school assignment and gave it an F, with comments like, "exaggeration -- avoid hyperbole," and "contradicts earlier statement."

In 2014 Cassidy co-sponsored an amendment to the Homeowner Flood Insurance Affordability Act in 2014 to limit annual premium increases for flood insurance, reinstate the flood insurance program's grandfathering provision, and eliminate a provision that required an increase to actuarial levels when a home is sold.

Cassidy was a vocal opponent of the Patient Protection and Affordable Care Act (commonly called Obamacare or the Affordable Care Act), arguing that it would fail to lower costs and give too much decision-making authority to the federal government. In September 2014, the House passed the Employee Health Care Protection Act of 2013 (H.R. 3522; 113th Congress), sponsored by Cassidy, enabling Americans to keep health insurance policies that do not meet all of the Affordable Care Act's requirements. In March 2017, Cassidy sent a letter to one of his constituents that falsely asserted that Obamacare "allows a presidentially handpicked 'Health Choices Commissioner' to determine what coverage and treatments are available to you."

Cassidy supported the Lowering Gasoline Prices to Fuel an America That Works Act of 2014 (H.R. 4899; 113th Congress), a bill to revise existing laws regarding the development of oil and gas resources on the Outer Continental Shelf. The bill is intended to increase domestic energy production and lower gas prices. He argued that the bill "would allow us to take advantage of our natural resources and expands our energy manufacturing and construction industries."

Committee assignments (113th Congress)
 Committee on Energy and Commerce
 Subcommittee on Health
 Subcommittee on Environment and Economy
 Subcommittee on Energy and Power

Caucuses
While in the House of Representatives, Cassidy was a member of many congressional caucuses, including the House Tea Party Caucus and Republican Study Committee.

U.S. Senate

Elections

2014 

Cassidy ran for the U.S. Senate in the 2014 election, in which he was endorsed by Republican Senator David Vitter. He defeated three-term incumbent Democratic Senator Mary Landrieu in the run-off election held on Saturday, December 6, 2014, receiving 56% of the vote to Landrieu's 44%. It was the first Republican victory for the seat since William P. Kellogg in 1883.

2020

Cassidy was reelected in 2020, and won every parish but one.

Tenure

115th Congress
On May 8, 2017, Cassidy appeared on Jimmy Kimmel Live! and discussed health care in the United States. He said that any legislation that he would support must meet the "Jimmy Kimmel test", namely: "Would a child born with congenital heart disease be able to get everything he or she would need in that first year of life?" Kimmel had earlier chastised Republicans for voting to repeal the Affordable Care Act and replace it with legislation that would not ensure protection for children such as his newborn, who was born with a heart defect that required immediate surgery.

In September 2017, Cassidy and Lindsey Graham introduced legislation to repeal and replace the Affordable Care Act. The "Graham–Cassidy" bill would eliminate the ACA's marketplace subsidies, repeal the ACA's Medicaid expansion, and introduce a temporary block grant that would expire in 2026. The legislation would also impose a per-enrollee cap on Medicaid funding. The Kaiser Family Foundation noted that the legislation "would fundamentally alter the current federal approach to financing health coverage for more than 80 million people who have coverage through the ACA (Medicaid expansion or marketplace) or through the traditional Medicaid program." An analysis by the Center for Budget and Policy Priorities found that the legislation "would cut federal health care funding by $299 billion relative to current law" in the year 2027 alone and estimated that it would leave 32 million more Americans without health insurance. President Donald Trump endorsed the bill.

The bill does not meet the "Jimmy Kimmel test", as it would allow states to eliminate requirements to cover children with conditions like that of Kimmel's child. Kimmel condemned Cassidy, calling him a liar, listed the health organizations that opposed Graham–Cassidy, and urged his viewers to contact their Congressional representatives about the legislation. Cassidy responded to Kimmel, saying that Kimmel "doesn't understand" the legislation. Cassidy also said that under Graham–Cassidy, "more people will have coverage" than under the Affordable Care Act. According to the Washington Post fact checker, Cassidy "provided little evidence to support his claim of more coverage... the consensus [among health care analysts] is that his funding formula makes his claim all but impossible to achieve."

117th Congress

Cassidy was participating in the certification of the 2021 United States Electoral College vote count when Trump supporters stormed the United States Capitol. He tweeted during the attack, calling them "hooligans" and the storming "un-American." He later said the participants were guilty of sedition "and should be prosecuted as such." When the Capitol was secure and Congress resumed, Cassidy voted to support the certification of the electoral college count.

On February 9, 2021, Cassidy voted that Trump's impeachment trial was unconstitutional. After the Senate voted that the trial was constitutional, he was one of seven Republicans to vote to convict Trump of inciting insurrection. Hours after the vote, the Republican Party of Louisiana censured him. Cassidy was also praised by several Democrats, including his predecessor Mary Landrieu, whom Cassidy defeated in 2014. On May 27, 2021, along with five other Republicans and all present Democrats, he voted to establish a bipartisan commission to investigate the January 6 storming of the U.S. Capitol. The vote failed for lack of 60 required "yes" votes.

Committee assignments
 Committee on Energy and Natural Resources
Subcommittee on Energy (chairman)
Subcommittee on Public Lands, Forests and Mining
Subcommittee on Water and Power
 Committee on Finance
Subcommittee on International Trade, Customs, and Global Competitiveness
Subcommittee on Social Security, Pensions, and Family Policy
Subcommittee on Health Care
Subcommittee on Fiscal Responsibility and Economic Growth
 Committee on Health, Education, Labor, and Pensions
Subcommittee on Children and Families
Subcommittee on Employment and Workplace Safety
Subcommittee on Primary Health and Retirement Security
 Committee on Veterans' Affairs
 Joint Economic Committee

Caucuses
Senate Republican Conference

Political positions
Some regard Cassidy as a moderate Republican. He is ranked highly by conservative organizations. The American Conservative Union's Center for Legislative Accountability gives Cassidy a lifetime rating of 82.79.

Agriculture 
In July 2019, Cassidy was one of eight senators to introduce the Agricultural Trucking Relief Act, a bill that would alter the definition of an agricultural commodity to include both horticultural and aquacultural products and promote greater consistency in regulation by federal and state agencies as part of an attempt to ease regulatory burdens on trucking and the agri-community.

Defense 
In July 2019 Cassidy was one of 16 Republican senators to send Acting Office of Management and Budget (OMB) Director Russell Vought, Acting White House Chief of Staff Mick Mulvaney, and Treasury Secretary Steven Mnuchin a letter encouraging them to work with them to prevent a continuing resolution "for FY 2020 that would delay the implementation of the President’s National Defense Strategy (NDS) and increase costs" and arguing that the yearlong continuing resolution administration officials favored would render the Defense Department "incapable of increasing readiness, recapitalizing our force, or rationalizing funding to align with the National Defense Strategy (NDS)."

Gun law

Cassidy opposes gun control as a matter of principle.

In January 2019, Cassidy was one of 31 Republican senators to cosponsor the Constitutional Concealed Carry Reciprocity Act, a bill introduced by John Cornyn and Ted Cruz that would allow people with concealed-carry privileges in their home state to exercise this right in any other state with concealed-carry laws while concurrently abiding by that state's laws.

In May 2022, after the Robb Elementary School shooting, Cassidy reaffirmed his opposition to banning any kind of guns, including assault rifles such as the AR-15. At the same time, during a live video discussion on youth mental health hosted by the Washington Post, he said he was "open to some discussions on ways to prevent shootings", such as red-flag laws and expanded background checks. Cassidy later became one of ten Republican senators to support a bipartisan agreement on gun control, which included a red flag provision, a support for state crisis intervention orders, funding for school safety resources, stronger background checks for buyers under the age of 21, and penalties for straw purchases.

Taxes 
In 2019, along with Democrats Amy Klobuchar and Doug Jones and Republican Pat Toomey, Cassidy was a lead sponsor of the Gold Star Family Tax Relief Act, a bill that would undo a provision in the Tax Cuts and Jobs Act that raised the tax on the benefit children receive from a parent's Department of Defense survivor benefits plan to 37% from an average of 12% to 15% before the 2017 law. The bill passed in the Senate in May 2019.

On July 30, 2019, Cassidy and Senator Kyrsten Sinema released a proposal under which new parents would be authorized to advance their child tax credit benefits in order to receive a $5,000 cash benefit upon either birth or adoption of a child. The parents' child tax credit would then be reduced by $500 for each year of the following decade. The senators described their proposal as the first bipartisan paid parental leave plan.

Abortion 
Cassidy opposes abortion after 20 weeks and any federal funding for abortion. He supported the 2022 overturning of Roe v. Wade, calling it a decision that "recognizes that an unborn child has a right to life."

Personal life 
Cassidy's wife, Laura (née Layden), is also a physician; they met during their respective residencies in Los Angeles and married on September 29, 1989. In the early 1990s, both worked at the Earl K. Long Medical Center, where Laura was the hospital's head of surgery. Cassidy worked as a gastroenterologist at the facility until it closed in 2013. They have three children. They are members of The Chapel on the Campus, a nondenominational Christian church that meets on LSU's campus in Baton Rouge.

Electoral history

Louisiana State Senate

U.S. House of Representatives

U.S. Senate

See also

 Physicians in the United States Congress

References

External links
 U.S. Senator Bill Cassidy official U.S. Senate website
 Bill Cassidy for U.S. Senate campaign website
 
 

|-

|-

|-

|-

|-

1957 births
21st-century American politicians
American people of Irish descent
American people of Welsh descent
Living people
Republican Party Louisiana state senators
Louisiana State University alumni
People from Highland Park, Illinois
Physicians from Louisiana
Politicians from Baton Rouge, Louisiana
Republican Party members of the United States House of Representatives from Louisiana
Republican Party United States senators from Louisiana
Tea Party movement activists
American gastroenterologists